The Circinus Galaxy (ESO 97-G13) is a Seyfert galaxy in the constellation of Circinus. The galaxy is undergoing tumultuous changes, as rings of gas are likely being ejected from the galaxy. Its outermost ring is 1400 light-years across while the inner ring is 260 light-years across. Although the Circinus galaxy can be seen using a small telescope, it was not noticed until 1977 because it lies close to the plane of the Milky Way and is obscured by galactic dust. The Circinus Galaxy is a Type II Seyfert galaxy and is one of the closest known active galaxies to the Milky Way, though it is probably slightly farther away than Centaurus A.

Circinus Galaxy produced supernova SN 1996cr, which was identified over a decade after it exploded. This supernova event was first observed during 2001 as a bright, variable object in a Chandra X-ray Observatory image, but it was not confirmed as a supernova until years later.

The Circinus Galaxy is one of twelve large galaxies in the "Council of Giants" surrounding the Local Group in the Local Sheet. One object is possibly a satellite of the Circinus Galaxy, known as HIZOA J1353-58. HIZOA J1353-58 was discovered in a survey of neutral hydrogen (H I) and is located within the Zone of Avoidance.

References

External links
 
 Chandra X observatory  Examines Black Holes Large and Small in Nearby Galaxy
 The Hubble European Space Agency  picture and information
 

Local Sheet
Circinus (constellation)
Seyfert galaxies
50779
97-G13